John Leonard Marriott (1 April 1928 – 9 February 2016) was an English professional footballer who made more than 400 appearances in the Football League playing as an outside right for Sheffield Wednesday, Huddersfield Town and Scunthorpe United.

References

1928 births
2016 deaths
Sportspeople from Scunthorpe
English footballers
Association football wingers
Scunthorpe United F.C. players
Sheffield Wednesday F.C. players
Huddersfield Town A.F.C. players
Midland Football League players
English Football League players